Platinocyanide, also known as tetracyanoplatinate (IUPAC), cyanoplatinate, or platinocyanate, is a polyatomic ion with the molecular formula [Pt(CN)4]2−. The name also applies to compounds containing this ion, which are salts of the hypothetical platinocyanic acid (sometimes platinocyanhydric acid).

Barium platinocyanide, Ba[Pt(CN)4] is a phosphor and a scintillator. It fluoresces in the presence of x-rays and gamma rays. It was important in the discovery of X-rays, and in the development of the fluoroscope.

One platinocyanide salt, Krogmann's salt (dipotassium tetracyanoplatinate bromide trihydrate), has unusually high electric conductance.

Cyano complexes
Phosphors and scintillators
Cyanides
Cyanometallates